Mount Pleasant is a small community in Lennox and Addington County, Ontario, Canada, situated west of Napanee.

Communities in Lennox and Addington County